Susan F. Ferree (Nelson; January 14, 1844 - September 6, 1919) was an American journalist and social reformer from Iowa. Ferree served as a Washington, D.C. newspaper correspondent. She favored women's suffrage and women's rights; she also affiliated with the Woman's Christian Temperance Union (WCTU). Ferree died in 1919.

Biography
Susan Frances Nelson was born in Mount Pleasant, Iowa, January 14, 1844.  Her parents were Frances S. Wray Nelson and John S. Nelson, who was a lineal descent of Thomas "Scotch Tom" Nelson, the founder of Old York, Virginia. His oldest son, William Nelson, was at one time president of the king's council. William's oldest son, Thomas Nelson Jr., was one of the signers of the Declaration of Independence, and the war governor of Virginia. At the age of one year she, with her parents removed to Keokuk, Iowa, which was her home for many years.

Ferree wrote poetry, but her forte was journalism, especially her newspaper correspondence from Washington, D.C. She supported temperance and the advancement of woman.

She was a member of the Order of the Eastern Star, Woman's Relief Corps, the Iowa Woman's Suffrage Association, Daughters of the American Revolution, and the local WCTU. In religion, Ferree was Episcopalian, and a communicant of St. Mary's Episcopal Church, of Ottumwa.

Personal life
In 1860, she married Jerome Dial Ferree (1838–1914), a business man, in Ottumwa, Iowa. By 1908, she had removed to San Diego, California. In 1913, he filed for divorce on grounds of abandonment.

She was one of several Southern California residents who formerly resided in Wapello County, Iowa that were present at the picnic in Eastlake Park, Ottumwa, Iowa, March 1911.

At the time of her death, she was a resident of Spreckels, California. Susan Ferree died September 6, 1919. Interment was in Independent Order of Odd Fellows Cemetery, Salinas, California.

References

Attribution

Bibliography

External links
 

1844 births
1919 deaths
19th-century American journalists
19th-century American women writers
Journalists from Iowa
American women journalists
People from Mount Pleasant, Iowa
Woman's Christian Temperance Union people
American social reformers
Activists from Iowa
People from Keokuk, Iowa
People from Ottumwa, Iowa
Wikipedia articles incorporating text from A Woman of the Century